Khaneh Khamis, also rendered as Khankhamis, may refer to:
 Khaneh Khamis-e Olya
 Khaneh Khamis-e Sofla